Crioceris duodecimpunctata or the spotted asparagus beetle is a species of shining leaf beetle belonging to the family Chrysomelidae, subfamily Criocerinae.

The length of beetles varies from 5 to 6.5 millimeters. The colour of head, pronotum and elytra is reddish orange, while the scutellum is black. On the elytra there are twelve black dots.

It feeds on Cucurbitaceae and asparagus species. The larvae feed only on the asparagus berries, being the second most important pest of this plant, while adults prefer tender shoots and leaves.

They are found in the whole Palearctic realm, including the British Isles.

References
 Babilas V. F. Kagan, C. Piekarski - Handbook of plant protection - New York, Agricultural and Forestry Publishing House, 1982
 Karl Wilhelm Harde, Frantisek Severa and Edwin Möhn: The cosmos beetles Guide: Central European beetles. The Franckh-Kosmos Verlags-GmbH & Co KG, Stuttgart 2000

External links
 BioLib
 Culex.biol.uni.wroc.pl
 Fauna Europaea

Criocerinae
Beetles of Europe
Taxa named by Carl Linnaeus
Beetles described in 1758